Patricia L. Miller (born July 4, 1936) was a Republican member of the Indiana Senate, representing the 32nd District from 1983 to 2016. She served as the Chairman of Senate Committee on Health and Provider Services. Miller was a member of the Indiana House of Representatives from 1982 to 1983. She currently serves as the executive director for the Confessing Movement within the United Methodist Church.

References

External links
State Senator Patricia L. Miller official Indiana State Legislature site
 
 Votesmart.org

Republican Party Indiana state senators
Living people
Politicians from Indianapolis
Indiana University alumni
Women state legislators in Indiana
1936 births
Republican Party members of the Indiana House of Representatives
21st-century American politicians
21st-century American women politicians